Mitte is a district in Berlin.

Mitte (German for middle, i.e., city centre or downtown) may refer to:

Places

Germany
Mitte (locality), a locality of Mitte district in Berlin
Mitte (Bielefeld), a district in Bielefeld
Mitte (Bremen), a district in Bremen
Hamburg-Mitte, a district in Hamburg
Hanover-Mitte, a district in Hanover
Stuttgart-Mitte, a district in Stuttgart

Infrastructures
Dresden Mitte railway station, a railway station in Dresden (Germany)
Wien Mitte railway station, a railway station in Vienna (Austria)

See also